A computer aided transceiver (CAT) is a device used by radio amateurs for controlling a transceiver radio receiver using a computer.

Conventional transmitters are manually controlled and used to transmit voice using buttons, dials, etc. However, advances in electronics have come to market devices that can be controlled by a computer and allow digital modes such as packet radio and also the use of satellite tracking, because it can continuously change the device's frequency according to the Doppler effect. This is done by connecting a Radio receiver and a PC using a CAT interface and a CAT Program

A CAT interface is a piece of hardware that connects the PC and radio that provides a connection to allows the radio and the PC to communicate with each other. The CAT interface provides the signals to and fro via correct voltage levels and in the case of a Universal Serial Bus (USB) CAT interface it requires a "protocol" for communication but communication itself is down to the radio and the software on the PC.

Software that may be called a CAT program allows a radio to be controlled through the PC. Changes made on the radio through user interactions on the CAT Program are (generally) shown on the PC's screen. 

The functionality of CAT equipment (software & interface) depends on the radio and what features the software writers included in the CAT software. Modern radio systems do have more CAT functionality

If you run a logging program that supports CAT, then that software may take advantage of the CAT system by retrieving information from the radio to help fill in log details, such as the frequency that the contact was made. 

CAT is also useful on many radios where there are many sub-menus in the radios menu system, and many of the sub-menu items can be easily changed via the PC. On many HF radios, the CAT system is also used to program the memories on the radio, but you would need to use appropriate programming software.

A CAT interface does not receive or transmit any DATA mode, that is the purpose of a DATA interface. Although, both may be used at the same time with the correct CAT Equipment.

DATA modes, and getting audio to and from the PC is the function of a DATA interface. A completely different thing but it is easier and more useful when CAT and DATA are used at the same time. Wouldn't it be nice to have an interface that could operate Frequency-shift keying (FSK), Audio FSK (AFSK), (real) Morse Code (CW), with a CAT interface and its own sound card..... (eg. The DigiMaster Pro3).

See also 
 Hamlib : A library that allows to exploit the CAT interfaces of many radio transceivers.
 Socialhams: A blog explaining the use of CAT and its interfaces using RS232.

Telecommunications
Amateur radio